Tamas may refer to:

 Tamas (philosophy), a concept of darkness and death in Hindu philosophy
 Tamás (name), a given name in Hungarian (Thomas)
 Tamas (film), a 1987 TV series/movie directed by Govind Nihalani
 Tamas (novel), a 1975 novel by Bhisham Sahni
 Christian Tămaș, Romanian writer
 Gabriel Tamaș (born 1983), Romanian footballer
 Vladimir Tămaș, Romanian footballer

See also 
 Tama (disambiguation)

hu:Tamás